Nielegalna is the first album by Polish pop singer Ewa Sonnet, released in Poland by IFactory Sp. z o.o. on October 13, 2006.  Nielegalna translates as “illegal” in English.

Track listing

Personnel
 Ewa Sonnet - vocals
 Paweł Marciniak - keyboards, guitar, bass
 Michał Marciniak - guitar
 Sławek Romanowski - percussion

References 
2006 debut albums
Ewa Sonnet albums